Judge Junius G. Adams House is a historic home located at 11 Stuyvesant Road, Biltmore Forest, Buncombe County, North Carolina. It was built in 1921, and is a two-story, rectangular plan, Tudor Revival style dwelling. It has rough-faced stone veneer on the first story and false half-timbering on the second, with a slate gable roof. Also on the property is a contributing gardener's residence (1931) and tool shed (1931).

It was listed on the National Register of Historic Places in 2001.

References

Houses on the National Register of Historic Places in North Carolina
Tudor Revival architecture in North Carolina
Houses completed in 1921
Houses in Buncombe County, North Carolina
National Register of Historic Places in Buncombe County, North Carolina